The Crimes Act 1958 is an Act of the  Parliament of Victoria.
The Act codified most common law crimes in the jurisdiction.

References

1958 in Australian law
Australian criminal law
Victoria (Australia) legislation